John Tomlinson (born 20 October 1933) is a British former sports shooter. He competed in the 50 metre pistol event at the 1960 Summer Olympics.

References

1933 births
Living people
British male sport shooters
Olympic shooters of Great Britain
Shooters at the 1960 Summer Olympics
Sportspeople from Preston, Lancashire